Ivanhood  is a 1992 Dutch comedy film directed by Paul Ruven.

Cast
Christo van Klaveren	 ... 	Ivanhood
Maike Meijer	... 	Eerste Vrouw
Odette van der Molen	... 	Slanore
Fabienne Meershoek	... 	Vrouw in kerker
Joy Hoes	... 	Vrouw in bad
Carine Korteweg	... 	Robijn
Gusta Geleynse	... 	Weddenschap-vrouw 1 (as Gusta Geleijnse)
Jolien Wanninkhof	... 	Weddenschap-vrouw 2
Annemarike Ruitenbeek	... 	Eerste koerier
Alice Reys	... 	Saffier
Willemijn van der Ree	... 	Zwangere koerie

External links 
 

1992 films
1990s Dutch-language films
1992 comedy films
Dutch comedy films